Falubaz Zielona Góra is a Polish motorcycle speedway team based in Zielona Góra who currently races in 1. Liga. The club has won  Polish Championship seven times. It is commonly known as Falubaz due to one of its former names.

Stadium 
The stadium, informally named as W69, is located on 69 Wrocławska Street. It contains 15,000 seats. The track is 337.50 metres long and has a granite surface. It has had an inflatable airfence since May 4, 2006. The stadium was later renovated with floodlights erected and the track widened on the bends. The club's new headquarters were also built and moved from 31 Dworcowa Street.

History

1946 to 1979 
The club was founded in 1946 with the establishing of a motorcycle department of Militia Sports Club (Polish Milicyjny Klub Sportowy). The first speedway race in the city took place on a 450 meters long track on October 20, 1946. The winner was Zygmunt Dolata as he hold best time of the meeting.

In 1947, Mieczysław Chlebisz, a re-emigrant from the United Kingdom, arrived back in the city, bringing the first professional speedway motorcycle which had been used in Britain. In 1948, a Poznan District League was set up, containing nine teams, including Unia Zielona Góra. The club's riders were (in alphabetical order): Jerzy Błoch, Mieczysław Chlebicz, Kazimierz Juzala, Alfons Kostusiak, Ksawery Sawicki, Józef Śmigielski, Stanisław Świstak and Marian Zadoń. 

Second division honours were won in 1963/1964, 1971, 1975 and 1977. In between they won the bronze medal in the Team Speedway Polish Championship in 1973 and in 1979 they won their second bronze medal.

1980 to 1999 
The 1980s saw a period of significant success for the club; they won their first team gold medal in 1981 and followed this up by defending their crown in 1982. In addition, Andrzej Huszcza won the 1982 Polish Individual Speedway Championship. Other riders at the time included Henryk Olszak, Maciej Jaworek and Jan Krzystyniak.

Just three years later in 1985 they secured a third gold medal and Maciej Jaworek was Polish champion in 1986. The good form continued as they picked up a silver medal in 1989 before winning a fourth Championship gold medal in 1991. The period of success was followed by nine seasons of mediocrity.

2000 to 2007 
When the Ekstraliga was introduced in 2000, Zielona Gora were in 1. Liga but were able to win the division and return to the top league for 2001. However they bounced back and forth from the divisions winning the 1.Liga in both 2002 and 2006. Rafał Okoniewski won the Golden Helmet in 2003.

2008 to present 

It was not until 2008 that they won a top league honour, winning the bronze medal, before being crowned champions of Poland in 2009 for the fifth time in their history. 

The team then embarked on another superb run, winning the Polish Pairs Speedway Championship in 2009 (Rafał Dobrucki and Grzegorz Walasek), team silver in 2010, gold in 2011 and 2013. Some of the star riders at the time were former world champion Greg Hancock, Swede, Andreas Jonsson and Piotr Protasiewicz. 

During celebrations of the team's victory 2011 victory, a fan was accidentally run over and by an unmarked police vehicle and died, which led to overnight riots.

Patryk Dudek completed the Polish Championship and Golden Helmet double during the 2016 Polish speedway season and the team picked up a bronze medal.

In 2021 the team were relegted from the Ekstraliga.

Teams

2023 team 
 Przemysław Pawlicki
 Krzysztof Buczkowski
 Rasmus Jensen
 Jan Kvěch
 Rohan Tungate
 Luke Becker
 Fabian Ragus
 Dawid Rempała 
 Filip Frącewicz
 Kacper Rychliński

Previous teams

 2022 team

 Piotr Protasiewicz
 Jan Kvěch
 Max Fricke
 Rohan Tungate
 Mateusz Tonder
 Krzysztof Buczkowski
 Antoni Mencel
 Maksym Borowiak
 Fabian Ragus

Notable riders

References

Polish speedway teams
Sport in Zielona Góra